Every Time We Say Goodbye is a 1986 American drama film starring Tom Hanks and Cristina Marsillach. Hanks plays a gentile American in the Royal Air Force, stationed in mandatory Jerusalem, who falls in love with a girl from a Sephardic Jewish family.

The film has the unusual distinction of being partly in the Ladino language. With young lovers of very different backgrounds with religious/cultural differences, the film is an account of a forbidden love.

Plot
Lt. David  Bradley (Tom Hanks) is an American pilot who joins the Royal Air Force (RAF) before the United States enters World War II. After his North American P-51 Mustang is shot down in North Africa, he recovers from a leg injury in Jerusalem.

During his recovery, David meets Sarah Perrara (Cristina Marsillach), a serene girl of Spanish Jewish descent. The two young people are attracted to each other but she is convinced that their diverse backgrounds mean it could never work. Her family's disapproval and the fact that he is a gentile son of a Protestant minister, stand in their way.

Although they keep running into each other in the small community, they find themselves parting as frequently as they find each other.

Cast
 
 Tom Hanks as David Bradley
 Cristina Marsillach as Sarah Perrara
 Benedict Taylor as Peter Ross
 Anat Atzmon as Victoria Sasson
 Gila Almagor as Lea
 Monny Moshonov as Nessim (credited as Monny Moshonov)
 Avner Hiskyahu as Raphael (credited as Avner Hiskyahu)
 Esther Parnass as Rosa
 Orna Porat as Mrs. Finkelstein
 Nissim Azikri as Shaltiel (credited as Nissim Azikry)
 Moshe Ivgy as Daniel (credited as Moshe Ivgi)
 Orit Weisman as Mathilda
 David Menachem as Elie
 Avi Keidar as Sammy
 Alon Aboutboul as Joseph (credited as Alan Abovtboul)
 Dafna Armoni as Clara (credited as Daphne Armony)

Production
After his breakout role in Splash (1984), Tom Hanks signed on to star in Every Time We Say Goodbye. The drama was a departure from his earlier comedic television and screen roles. Hanks was also ready to devote time to establishing a more serious catalog, but in contrast to the Hollywood films he had worked on, considered Every Time We Say Goodbye at $3.7 million, a "low budget" production. Much of the film was shot on location in Israel, including in the King David Hotel, Jerusalem.

Reception
At the time, Every Time We Say Goodbye was considered to be the most expensive Israeli film ($3.7 million), however, the film was a major box office bomb, with worldwide gross of only $278,623. To this day, according to Box Office Mojo, it remains the lowest grossing theatrically released film starring Hanks.  Reviews of the film were lukewarm at best, and the film had a limited release in theaters.

Film critic Janet Maslin of The New York Times gave the film a negative review, saying "Tom Hanks is utterly out of place in the Israeli romance 'Every Time We Say Goodbye' for at least two reasons: because there's something so innately comic about him, even in solemn surroundings, and because he has so much more energy than the film does."

References
Notes

Citations

Bibliography

 Gardner, David. Tom Hanks: The Unauthorized Biography.  London: Blake, 1999. .
 Pfeiffer, Lee and Michael D. Lewis. The Films of Tom Hanks. New York: Citadel Press, 1996. .

External links
 
 
 
 

1986 drama films
Judaeo-Spanish-language films
1986 films
Films directed by Moshé Mizrahi
Films scored by Philippe Sarde
American aviation films
Films about shot-down aviators
Films set in Israel
Films set in Jerusalem
Films shot in Israel
TriStar Pictures films
American drama films
1980s English-language films
1980s American films
1986 multilingual films
American multilingual films